Novi Christian Academy (NCA), formerly Franklin Road Christian School (FRCS), in Novi, Michigan, is a private, coeducational, college preparatory Christian preK–12 day school with a non-denominational Christian philosophy.
NCA is affiliated with Brightmoor Christian Church, and was founded in 1986. The church and school moved from Southfield, Michigan, to a new campus in Novi, Michigan, in 2000. The school mascot is the "Warriors".

NCA competes in the Michigan Independent Athletic Conference (MIAC), and was red division champion for Varsity Men's Soccer, 2008; Varsity Men's Basketball, 2009; Varsity Women's Basketball, 2009; and Varsity Baseball, 2009.

References

External links

Christian schools in Michigan
Educational institutions established in 1986
Schools in Novi, Michigan
Private K-12 schools in Michigan
High schools in Oakland County, Michigan
Preparatory schools in Michigan
1986 establishments in Michigan